Macdonald-Cartier may refer to:
Macdonald-Cartier Freeway, in southern Ontario, also known as Highway 401
Macdonald-Cartier Bridge, a bridge between Ottawa, Ontario, and Gatineau, Quebec
Ottawa Macdonald–Cartier International Airport, a major Canadian airport in Ottawa
Macdonald-Cartier High School, a former Quebec high school in Saint-Hubert, Quebec, that merged with Richelieu Valley Regional High School
École secondaire Macdonald-Cartier, a French public language high school in Sudbury